Camphora septentrionalis is a species of flowering plant in the family Lauraceae, native to central China. A commercially important timber tree, it is also used as a street tree in a number of Chinese cities.

References

septentrionalis
Trees of China
Endemic flora of China
Flora of North-Central China
Flora of South-Central China
Plants described in 1936